Hubneria estigmenensis is a species of bristle fly in the family Tachinidae.

Distribution
United States, Canada.

References

Exoristinae
Insects described in 1943
Diptera of North America